Georges Géronimi (16 June 1892 – 6 March 1994) was a French football forward. He played with AF Garenne-Colombes and represented France in one 5-2 loss in a friendly against Switzerland. His brother Charles also had one cap for the France national team in 1914 and was killed the following year during World War I.

References

External links
 
 

1892 births
1994 deaths
French centenarians
French footballers
France international footballers
Association football forwards
Men centenarians